Moses Buster Drayton (March 2, 1952 – November 20, 2022) was an American boxer who won the IBF world title at light middleweight (154lb). Drayton turned pro in 1978 and won the vacant IBF light middleweight title with a decision win over Carlos Santos in 1986. He defended the belt twice before losing it to Matthew Hilton the following year. In 1988 he took on WBA light middleweight titleholder Julian Jackson, but was defeated via TKO in the third round. He retired in 1995 at the age of 43.

Military service
Drayton joined the United States Marines during 1972, later rising to the rank of Sergeant. During 2016, he was honored for his service by the National Federation of Black Veterans.

Return to the ring
Drayton returned to the ring in an exhibition in 2012. Drayton, aged 57, returned on January 28, 2012, in an exhibition in Philadelphia against former Philadelphia police officer Floyd 'Sugar Boy' Richards on the undercard of Dhafir Smith versus Quinton Rankin. Drayton and Richards both worked as Police Officers for the Department of Veterans Affairs at the Phila VA Medical Center. Buster Drayton won the IBF title by 15-round decision at the Meadowlands over Carlos Santos in 1986. He lost it to 26-0 Matthew Hilton at The Forum in Montreal, Quebec, Canada in 1987. The South Philadelphia's fighter's final professional record was 40-15-1, with 28 kayos. In terms of longevity in the ring, Drayton was nine years younger in 2012 than The Galveston Giant, legendary former World Heavyweight champion Jack Johnson, who last appeared in a charity exhibition for U.S. War Bonds at age 66 in 1945. Also, former Junior Welterweight champion Saoul Mamby fought a professional bout at age 60 in 2008, but lost his comeback attempt by ten-round decision.

Personal life and death
Drayton died on November 20, 2022, at the age of 70.

Professional boxing record

See also
List of world light-middleweight boxing champions

References

External links

 

|-

1952 births
2022 deaths
American male boxers
Boxers from Philadelphia
Middleweight boxers
World light-middleweight boxing champions
International Boxing Federation champions
African-American boxers
United States Marines